Ahmet İlhan Özek (born 1 January 1988) is a Turkish footballer who plays as a winger for Altınordu.

International

Ahmet İlhan Özek scored his first two international goals four days apart. He opened the scoring in a 6–1 win over Kosovo, before opening accounts in Turkey's next match, a 2–1 away win over the Republic of Ireland.

Scores and results table. Turkey's goal tally first:

References

External links
 
 Soccerway Profile

1988 births
Living people
Turkish footballers
Turkey international footballers
Turkey B international footballers
Aydınspor footballers
Bozüyükspor footballers
Manisaspor footballers
Kardemir Karabükspor footballers
Gençlerbirliği S.K. footballers
Giresunspor footballers
Süper Lig players
TFF First League players
TFF Second League players
People from Aydın
Association football midfielders